Namdalseid is a village in Namsos municipality in Trøndelag county, Norway. The Namdalseid Church sits just southwest of the village. There's a school in the village as well.

Prior to 2020, the village was the administrative centre of the old Namdalseid Municipality.

References

Villages in Trøndelag
Namsos